This is a list of people who have served as Custos Rotulorum of Surrey.

 Sir Thomas Pope bef. 1544–1559
 William Howard, 1st Baron Howard of Effingham bef. 1562–1573
 Edward Clinton, 1st Earl of Lincoln 1573–1585
 Charles Howard, 1st Earl of Nottingham 1585–1618
 Sir Edward Howard 1618–1620
 Sir Francis Howard 1620 – aft. 1621
 Thomas Howard, 21st Earl of Arundel 1624–1636
 Henry Howard, Baron Maltravers 1636–1646
 Interregnum
 John Mordaunt, 1st Viscount Mordaunt 1660–1675
 George Berkeley, 1st Earl of Berkeley 1675–1689
 Henry Howard, 7th Duke of Norfolk 1689
 George Berkeley, 1st Earl of Berkeley 1689–1698
 Charles Berkeley, 2nd Earl of Berkeley 1699–1710
 James Berkeley, 3rd Earl of Berkeley 1710–1736
 Thomas Onslow, 2nd Baron Onslow 1737–1740
For later custodes rotulorum, see Lord Lieutenant of Surrey.

References
Institute of Historical Research - Custodes Rotulorum 1544-1646
Institute of Historical Research - Custodes Rotulorum 1660-1828

Surrey